Lee Soo-ja (born 1960) is a female former South Korean international table tennis player.

Table tennis career
She won a bronze medal in the women's singles and a silver medal in the Corbillon Cup (women's team event) at the 1981 World Table Tennis Championships. Four years later she won another bronze in the women's team event.

See also
 List of table tennis players
 List of World Table Tennis Championships medalists

References

South Korean female table tennis players
1960 births
Living people
Asian Games medalists in table tennis
Table tennis players at the 1978 Asian Games
Table tennis players at the 1982 Asian Games
Medalists at the 1978 Asian Games
Medalists at the 1982 Asian Games
Asian Games silver medalists for South Korea
World Table Tennis Championships medalists
20th-century South Korean women